Mississauga—Streetsville is a  provincial electoral district in Ontario, Canada, that has been represented in the Legislative Assembly of Ontario since 2007. This riding is centred on the villages of Streetsville and Meadowvale.

Mississauga—Streetsville is one of the most affluent ridings in Ontario, along with Mississauga—Erindale and Mississauga South.

Riding history
It was created in 2003 from parts of Brampton West—Mississauga and Mississauga West ridings.

It consists of the part of the City of Mississauga bounded by a line drawn from the northwestern city limit southeast along Mississauga Road, northeast along Highway 401, southeast along Mavis Road, southwest along Britannia Road West, southeast along Terry Fox Way, southwest along Eglinton Avenue West, northwest along Erin Mills Parkway, southwest along Britannia Road West to the southwestern city limit.

Members of Provincial Parliament

Election results

2007 electoral reform referendum

See also

 List of Canadian federal electoral districts
 Past Canadian electoral districts
 Village of Streetsville
 Village of Meadowvale

Sources

Elections Ontario Past Election Results
Map of riding for 2018 election

Ontario provincial electoral districts
Politics of Mississauga